William Pearl Rhines (March 14, 1869 – January 30, 1922) was a professional baseball player.  He was a pitcher over parts of nine seasons (1890–1899) with the Cincinnati Reds, Louisville Colonels and Pittsburgh Pirates.  He led the National League in ERA twice (1890 and 1896) while playing for Cincinnati. For his career, he compiled a 114–103 record in 249 appearances, with a 3.47 ERA and 743 strikeouts.

He was born and later died in Ridgway, Pennsylvania, at the age of 52.  He was an alumnus of Bucknell University.

External links

Billy Rhines - Society for American Baseball Research

1869 births
1922 deaths
Major League Baseball pitchers
Baseball players from Pennsylvania
National League ERA champions
Cincinnati Reds players
Louisville Colonels players
Pittsburgh Pirates players
People from Ridgway, Pennsylvania
Bucknell University alumni
19th-century baseball players
Binghamton Crickets (1880s) players
Jersey City Skeeters players
Davenport Hawkeyes players
Grand Rapids Rippers players
Grand Rapids Furniture Makers players